Christian devotional literature (also called devotionals or Christian living literature) is religious writing that Christian individuals read for their personal growth and spiritual formation.

Popular devotionals

Books
Conferences (ca. 400), by John Cassian
The Ladder of Divine Ascent (ca. 600), by John Climacus
Hymns of Divine Love (ca. 1020), by Symeon the New Theologian
On Loving God (ca. 1140), by Bernard of Clairvaux
The Flowing Light of Divinity (ca. 1270), by Mechthild of Magdeburg
The Spiritual Espousals (ca. 1340), by Jan van Ruusbroec
The Dialogue of Divine Providence (ca. 1377), by Catherine of Siena
Revelations of Divine Love (ca. 1400), by Julian of Norwich 
The Imitation of Christ (ca. 1423), by Thomas à Kempis
The Interior Castle (1577), by Teresa of Avila
Ascent of Mount Carmel (1579), by John of the Cross
Introduction to the Devout Life (1609), by François de Sales
The Saints' Everlasting Rest (1650), by Richard Baxter
The Rule and Exercises of Holy Living (1650), by Jeremy Taylor
True Devotion to Mary (1712), by Louis de Montfort
A Serious Call to a Devout and Holy Life (1728), by William Law
The Practice of the Presence of God (1792), by Brother Lawrence
The Christian Year (1827), by John Keble
The Greatest Thing in the World (1889), by Henry Drummond
Streams in the Desert (1925), by L. B. Cowman
My Utmost for His Highest (ca. 1927), by Oswald Chambers
Prayer (1931), by O. Hallesby
A Testament of Devotion (1941), by Thomas R. Kelly
The Pursuit of God (1948), by A. W. Tozer
Saint Augustine's Prayer Book (1967), by Loren Gavitt and Archie Drake (editors)
Jesus Calling (2004), by Sarah Young

Booklets
The Upper Room (1935-present), published by  Upper Room Ministries
Portals of Prayer (1937-present), published by Concordia Publishing House
Our Daily Bread (1956-present), published by Our Daily Bread Ministries

Online Devotional Literature
Our Daily Bread was among the earliest of the classic devotionals to appear on the Internet. Online archives of the devotional are available back to January 1994.   Upper Room Ministries began emailing the Upper Room daily devotional guide in 1997. In the years following, many Christian organizations began adding a daily devotional to their website. The following is an incomplete list of daily devotional services available through recognized Christian organizations.
 Campus Crusade for Christ
 Crosswalk.com
 Grace to You
 Lutheran Hour Ministries
 Moody Bible Institute

See also
 Bible study (Christian)
 Quiet Time
 Christian contemplation

References

Books about spirituality
List of Christian devotional literature
Religious literature
Devotional Lit